Aplin is a surname. Notable people with the surname include:

Anders Aplin (born 1991), Singapore footballer
Andrew Aplin (born 1991), American baseball player
Frank Aplin (1901–1965), New Zealand police officer
Gabrielle Aplin (born 1992), singer/songwriter from Bath, Somerset
Greg Aplin (born 1952), Australian politician (Liberal, NSW)
Henry H. Aplin (1841–1910), American Civil War veteran, businessman, and politician
Joseph Aplin (c.1740 – 1804), politician in Nova Scotia and Prince Edward Island 
Ken Aplin (1918–2004), umpire in Australian rules football
Nick Aplin (born 1952), Senior Lecturer at the Physical Education and Sports Science Academic Group at the National Institute of Education
Oliver Vernon Aplin (1858–1940), British ornithologist
Peter Aplin (1753–1817), admiral in Britain's Royal Navy
William Aplin (1840–1901), pastoralist, businessman and parliamentarian in Queensland, Australia

Other uses
Aplin, West Virginia

See also
Aplin Islet, off Queensland
Ross River (Queensland)#Aplin's Weir